Royal Air Force Montford Bridge or more simply RAF Montford Bridge is a former Royal Air Force satellite station located near Shrewsbury, Shropshire, England.

History

The following units were here at some point:
 No. 7 Anti-Aircraft Co-operation Unit RAF
 No. 11 (Pilots) Advanced Flying Unit RAF
 No. 34 Maintenance Unit RAF
 No. 61 Operational Training Unit (1942-45)
 A detachment of No. 577 Squadron RAF

Current use

The site is currently used as farmland.

References

Citations

Bibliography

Royal Air Force stations in Shropshire